Nancy Evans may refer to:
 
 Nancy Evans (table tennis) (1903–1998), Welsh table tennis player
 Nancy Evans (opera singer) (1915–2000), British opera singer (mezzo-soprano)
 Nancy Evans (actress) (1910–1963), American actress in Treasury Men in Action and Life with Father
 Nancy Evans (softball) (born 1975), American softball player and coach in 1997 Women's College World Series
 Nancy Hasty Evans, Massachusetts politician